Muye District is a district of the city of Xinxiang, Henan province, China.

History
The BC Battle of Muye ended Shang hegemony over the Wei and Yellow Rivers and established the state of Zhou.

Administrative divisions
As 2012, this district is divided to 7 subdistricts, 1 town and 1 township.
Subdistricts

Donggandao Subdistrict
Rongxiaolu Subdistrict
Beigandao Subdistrict
Huayuan Subdistrict
Weibei Subdistrict
Xinhuilu Subdistrict
Hepinglu Subdistrict

Towns
Wangcun

Townships
Muye Township

References

County-level divisions of Henan
Xinxiang